The United Nations Office at Nairobi (UNON) in Nairobi, the capital of Kenya, is one of four major United Nations office sites where numerous different UN agencies have a joint presence. Established in 1996, it is the UN's official headquarters in Africa.

The United Nations Office at Nairobi also hosts the global headquarters for two programmes: the United Nations Environmental Programme (UNEP) and the United Nations Human Settlements Programme (UN-Habitat).

In November 2004, the United Nations Security Council held a rare session at Nairobi to discuss the armed conflicts in southern and western Sudan that constituted a phase of the Second Sudanese Civil War. The meeting was convened at the urging of then-Ambassador John Danforth of the United States.

Site

The complex of buildings is located next to the Karura Forest in the Gigiri district of Nairobi, along United Nations Avenue. It stands across the street from the US Embassy in Kenya.

The UN complex contains a 'green' building, a completely energy and carbon-neutral building, housing UNEP and UN-Habitat offices. The building is the first of its kind in Africa, recycling water and using natural light to reduce reliance on artificial lighting. In addition, the building is designed to use natural flow of air as a substitute to air conditioning, and it contains solar panels to generate all the energy that the building might consume. It was opened on 31 March 2011 by UN Secretary-General Ban Ki-moon and Kenyan President Mwai Kibaki.

Burned Trees, a series of sculptures designed by Monegasque artist Philippe Pastor aimed at drawing attention to forest conflagrations, has been exhibited continuously at the office since 2006.

Visits 
The office complex can also be visited by the public, in the form of pre-booked, guided tours, provided by the UN Visitors' Service of Nairobi. Anyone interested has the opportunity to book a tour, during which one can learn about the history and work of the UN, while also getting an opportunity to see the offices, including the above-mentioned green building. Tours are available during office hours each day, in various languages (e.g. English, Chinese, German, French, Kiswahili).

Constituent agencies
Headquartered at Nairobi:
 United Nations Environment Programme (UNEP or UN Environment) 
 United Nations Human Settlements Programme (UN-Habitat)

Presence at Nairobi:
 Food and Agriculture Organization
 International Civil Aviation Organization
 International Labour Organization
 International Maritime Organization
 International Monetary Fund
 Joint United Nations Programme on HIV/AIDS
 United Nations Centre for Regional Development, Africa Office
 UN Women
 United Nations Development Programme
 United Nations Office on Drugs and Crime
 United Nations Educational, Scientific and Cultural Organization
 United Nations High Commission for Refugees
 United Nations Industrial Development Organization
 United Nations Children's Fund
 United Nations Common Air Services
 United Nations Office for the Coordination of Humanitarian Affairs
 United Nations Office for Project Services
 United Nations Political Office for Somalia
 United Nations Population Fund
 World Bank
 World Food Programme
 World Health Organization

UNON also hosts the annual East Africa Model United Nations Conference for secondary school and university students from East Africa.

Directors-General 
UNON is headed by a Director-General, who is at the rank of Under-Secretary-General in the United Nations System. The Director-General is appointed by the Secretary General.
The current Director-General is Zainab Bangura of Sierra Leone.

Klaus Töpfer, Germany, 1998–2006
Anna Tibaijuka, Tanzania, 2006–2009
Achim Steiner, Brazil, 2010–2011
Sahle-Work Zewde, Ethiopia, 2011–2018
Hanna Tetteh, Ghana, 2018–2019
Maimunah Mohd Sharif, Malaysia, 2019–2020 (Acting)
Zainab Bangura, Sierra Leone, 2020–present

See also

 United Nations Headquarters, New York City
 United Nations Office at Geneva
 United Nations Office at Vienna
 List of United Nations organizations by location

Notes

References

External links

 United Nations Office at Nairobi

Diplomatic buildings
United Nations properties
Buildings and structures in Nairobi
 
1996 establishments in Kenya